Kim Kielsen (born 30 November 1966) is a Greenlandic politician, who served as leader of the Siumut party and sixth prime minister of Greenland between 2014 and 2021.

Careers

Past careers
Kielsen was originally a mariner, and then a police officer with Rigspolitiet from 1996 to 2003 in Upernavik and Paamiut.

Political career
Kielsen entered politics in 2005 when he was elected to the Greenlandic parliament for Siumut and to the municipal government of Paamiut. In the government of Aleqa Hammond, he was the minister for housing, nature and the environment. He became acting premier in October 2014 when Hammond stepped down and the Siumut party subsequently elected Kielsen as its leader, awarding him 44 of the 65 votes. On 4 December 2014 his party, Atassut, and Demokraatit formed a new coalition. On 10 December 2014 the new ministers were represented.

In response to U.S. President Donald Trump's August 2019 interest in purchasing Greenland, Kielsen said the proposal was "not something to joke about", and "Greenland is not Danish. Greenland is Greenlandic. I persistently hope that this is not something that is seriously meant."

On November 29, 2020, Kielsen lost reelection to the chairmanship of the Siumut Party to Erik Jensen.

Personal life
Kim Kielsen is married to Judithe Kielsen, and they have two children.

References

1966 births
Living people
Prime Ministers of Greenland
Place of birth missing (living people)
Siumut politicians
Government ministers of Greenland
Environment ministers of Greenland
Housing ministers of Greenland
Greenlandic Inuit people
People from Sermersooq